Edward Archer may refer to:
Edward Archer (politician) (1871–1940), Australian politician
Edward Archer (physician) (1718–1789), English doctor associated with inoculation against smallpox
Special Ed (Edward Archer, born 1973), American hip hop musician
Ed Archer, musician in Fifth Angel
Edward Archer, High Sheriff of Cornwall in 1794
Edward Archer, perpetrator of the shooting of Jesse Hartnett

See also
Ted Archer (disambiguation)